Mowatt is a surname. Notable people with the surname include:

Alex Mowatt (born 1995), Leeds United footballer
Andrew Mowatt (born 1964), Canadian sprinter
Anna Cora Mowatt (1819–1870), author, playwright, public reader, and actress
Francis Mowatt (1837–1919), British civil servant
Francis Mowatt (politician) (1803–1891), British Radical politician
Judy Mowatt (born 1952), Jamaican reggae artist
Kemar Mowatt (born 1995), professional Jamaican hurdler
Magnus Mowatt (1917–1979), Scottish professional footballer
Taryne Mowatt (born 1986), former All-American pitcher for the University of Arizona softball team
Todd Mowatt, pioneer in the interactive entertainment industry
William Mowatt (1885–1943), New Zealand cricketer
Zeke Mowatt (born 1961), former American football tight end in the National Football League

See also

Mowat